Li Xun may refer to:

Li Xun (Western Liang) (died 421), final ruler of Western Liang
Li Xun (Tang dynasty) (died 784), Tang dynasty prince
Li Zhongyan (died 835), Tang dynasty politician, known as Li Xun in 835
Li Xun (footballer) (born 1992)